Cowiche (pronounced Cow-witch-ee) is a census-designated place and unincorporated community northwest of Yakima, Washington, near the eastern foothills of the Cascade Mountain range, in central Washington State (US).   Cowiche, sometimes spelled Cowychee, is said to mean "footbridge between the valley and the mountains."  The town had 428 people at the 2010 census.

History
The first inhabitants of the area were the  Tkai'waichash-hlama, a band or tribe of Native American people who lived along Cowiche Creek. The area was settled in the late nineteenth century by farmers who relied upon crops that did not require irrigation, such as wheat, barley, rye, and grazing cattle. Homesteading in Cowiche was difficult since fields had to be cleared of volcanic rock before they could be tilled and there was little rainfall in summer. In 1906, construction began on the Tieton Irrigation Project, a division of the broader Yakima Project. Irrigation water became available in 1907, and shortly thereafter, orchards began to replace wheatfields.

Way of Life
Cowiche, along with the neighboring town of Tieton, is served by the Highland School district Highland School District / Homepage.  The community takes great pride in its high school sports programs, and in 1988 their varsity men's basketball team won the Washington State A division championship. The boys soccer team also won the state championship in 2006, 2007 & 2015

Most people in the area are involved in agriculture.  Cowiche, like much of the Yakima Valley, is known for its apple crops.

Harvest Foods  is the hub of Cowiche's retail market, and has been a local landmark for years.  It was called Tate's Food Center from 1964-1972 and then Fred's Food Center until 2006.

Points of interest
 Cowiche Canyon

External links 
 Cowiche local community website

References

Unincorporated communities in Yakima County, Washington
Unincorporated communities in Washington (state)
Census-designated places in Washington (state)
Census-designated places in Yakima County, Washington